Ripping is extracting all or parts of digital content from a container. Originally, it meant to rip music out of Commodore 64 games. Later, the term was used to extract WAV or MP3 format files from digital audio CDs, but got applied as well to extract the contents of any media, including DVD and Blu-ray discs, and video game sprites.

Despite the name, neither the media nor the data is damaged after extraction. Ripping is often used to shift formats, and to edit, duplicate or back up media content. A rip is the extracted content, in its destination format, along with accompanying files, such as a cue sheet or log file from the ripping software.

To rip the contents out of a container is different from simply copying the whole container or a file. When creating a copy, nothing looks into the transferred file, nor checks if there is any encryption or not, and raw copy is also not aware of any file format. One can copy a DVD byte by byte via programs like the Linux dd command onto a hard disk, and play the resulting ISO file just as one would play the original DVD.

To rip contents is also different from grabbing an analog signal and re-encoding it, as it was done with early day CD-ROM drives not capable of digital audio extraction (DAE). Sometimes even encoding, i.e. digitizing audio and video originally stored on analog formats, such as vinyl records is incorrectly referred to as ripping.

Ripping software 

A CD ripper, CD grabber or CD extractor is a piece of software designed to extract or "rip" raw digital audio (in format commonly called CDDA) from a compact disc to a file or other output. Some all-in-one ripping programs can simplify the entire process by ripping and burning the audio to disc in one step, possibly re-encoding the audio on-the-fly in the process.

For example, audio CDs contain 16-bit, 44.1 kHz LPCM-encoded audio samples interleaved with secondary data streams and synchronization and error correction info. The ripping software tells the CD drive's firmware to read this data and parse out just the LPCM samples. The software then dumps them into a WAV or AIFF file, or feeds them to another codec to produce, for example, a FLAC or MP3 file. Depending on the capabilities of the ripping software, ripping may be done on a track-by-track basis, or all tracks at once, or over a custom range. The ripping software may also have facilities for detecting and correcting errors during or after the rip, as the process is not always reliable, especially when the CD or the drive containing the CD itself is damaged or defective.

There are also DVD rippers which operate in a similar fashion. Unlike CDs, DVDs do contain data formatted in files for use in computers. However, commercial DVDs are often encrypted (for example, using Content Scramble System/ARccOS Protection), preventing access to the files without using the ripping software's decryption ability, which may not be legal to distribute or use. DVD files are often larger than is convenient to distribute or copy to CD-R or ordinary (not dual-layer) DVD-R, so DVD ripping software usually offers the ability to re-encode the content, with some quality loss, so that it fits in smaller files.

Legality

When the material being ripped is not in the public domain, and the person making the rip does not have the copyright owner's permission, then such ripping may be regarded as copyright infringement. However, some countries either explicitly allow it in certain circumstances, or at least don't forbid it. Some countries also have fair use-type laws which allow unauthorized copies to be made under certain conditions.

Asia

Europe 

A directive of the European Union allows its member nations to instate in their legal framework a private copy exception to the authors and editors rights. If a member State chooses to do so, it must also introduce a compensation for the copyright holders. Most European countries, except for Norway, have introduced a private copying levy that compensates the owners directly from the country's budget. In 2009 the sum awarded to them was $55 million. In all but a few of these countries (exceptions include the UK and Malta), the levy is excised on all machines and blank materials capable of copying copyrighted works.

Under the directive, making copies for other people is forbidden, and if done for profit can lead to a jail sentence.

Netherlands 
In the Netherlands, citizens are allowed to make copies of their legally bought audio and video. This includes CD, SACD, as well as DVD and Blu-ray. These copies are called "home copies" and may only be used by the ripper. Public distribution of ripped files is not allowed.

Spain
In Spain, anyone is allowed to make a private copy of a copyrighted material for oneself, providing that the copier has accessed the original material legally.

United Kingdom
Private copying of copyrighted material is illegal in the United Kingdom. According to a 2009 survey, 59% of British consumers believed ripping a CD to be legal, and 55% admitted to doing it.

In 2010, the UK government sought input on modernizing copyright exceptions for the digital age, and commissioned the Hargreaves Review of Intellectual Property and Growth. The review asserted that a private copying exception was overdue, citing that users were unaware of what was even legally allowed, and that a copyright law where "millions of citizens are in daily breach of copyright, simply for shifting a piece of music or video from one device to another" was not "fit for the digital age". The review recommended, among other things, that the government consider adopting the EU Copyright Directive's recommendation that member states enact an exception for private, noncommercial copying so long as the rights holders receive "fair compensation." Other EU member states chose to implement the exception paired with a tax on music purchases or widely varying levies on copying equipment and blank media. However, the Review reasoned that no such collections are necessary when implementing a copyright exception for format-shifting:

In August 2011, the government broadly accepted the recommendations of the Hargreaves Review. At the end of 2012, the government published "Modernising Copyright", a document outlining specific changes the government intends to make, including the Hargreaves-recommended exception for private, noncommercial copying.

Following each milestone in the reform process, press reports circulated that ripping non-DRM-protected CDs and DVDs was no longer illegal. However, the actual legislation to implement the changes is not yet in force; the Intellectual Property Office had only begun seeking review of draft legislation in June 2013, and the resulting Statutory Instruments (SIs) weren't laid out for Parliamentary approval until March 27, 2014, and weren't actually approved until July 14 (Commons) and July 27 (Lords); with an effective date of October 1, 2014. Anticipating approval, the Intellectual Property Office published a guide for consumers to explain the forthcoming changes and to clarify what would remain illegal. The private copying exception may seem to conflict with the existing Copyright Directive prohibition on overriding or removing any DRM or TPM (technical protection measures) that are sometimes used on optical media to protect the content from ripping. However, the "Modernising Copyright" report makes clear that any workarounds to allow access will not involve a relaxation of the prohibition.

On 17 July 2015, the private copying exemption was overturned by the High Court of Justice following a complaint by BASCA, Musicians' Union, and UK Music, making private copying once again illegal. The groups objected to the exclusion of a compensation scheme, presenting evidence contradicting an assertion that an exemption would cause "zero or insignificant harm" to copyright holders and thus did not require compensation.

North America

United States
U.S. copyright law (Title 17 of the United States Code) generally says that making a copy of an original work, if conducted without the consent of the copyright owner, is infringement. The law makes no explicit grant or denial of a right to make a "personal use" copy of another's copyrighted content on one's own digital media and devices. For example, space shifting, by making a copy of a personally owned audio CD for transfer to an MP3 player for that person's personal use, is not explicitly allowed or forbidden.

Existing copyright statutes may apply to specific acts of personal copying, as determined in cases in the civil or criminal court systems, building up a body of case law. Consumer copyright infringement cases in this area, to date, have only focused on issues related to consumer rights and the applicability of the law to the sharing of ripped files, not to the act of ripping, per se.

Canada
The Copyright Act of Canada generally says that it is legal to make a backup copy of any copyrighted work if the user owns or has a licence to use a copy of the work or subject-matter as long as the user does not circumvent a technological protection measure or give any of the reproductions away. This means that in most cases, ripping DVDs in Canada is most likely illegal.

Oceania

Australia and New Zealand
In Australia and New Zealand a copy of any legally purchased music may be made by its owner, as long as it is not distributed to others and its use remains personal. In Australia, this was extended in 2006 to also include photographs and films.

Opinions of ripping
Recording industry representatives have made conflicting statements about ripping.

Executives claimed (in the context of Atlantic v. Howell) that ripping may be regarded as copyright infringement. In oral arguments before the Supreme Court in MGM Studios, Inc. v. Grokster, Ltd., MGM attorney Don Verrilli (later appointed United States Solicitor General by the Obama administration), stated: "The record companies, my clients, have said, for some time now, and it's been on their Website for some time now, that it's perfectly lawful to take a CD that you've purchased, upload it onto your computer, put it onto your iPod. There is a very, very significant lawful commercial use for that device, going forward."

Nevertheless, in lawsuits against individuals accused of copyright infringement for making files available via file-sharing networks, RIAA lawyers and PR officials have characterized CD ripping as "illegal" and "stealing".

Asked directly about the issue, RIAA president Cary Sherman asserted that the lawyers misspoke, and that the RIAA has never said whether it was legal or illegal, and he emphasized that the RIAA had not yet taken anyone to court over that issue alone.

Fair use

Although certain types of infringement scenarios are allowed as fair use and thus are effectively considered non-infringing, "personal use" copying is not explicitly mentioned as a type of fair use, and case law has not yet established otherwise.

Personal copying acknowledgments

According to Congressional reports, part of the Audio Home Recording Act (AHRA) of 1992 was intended to resolve the debate over home taping. However, 17 USC 1008, the relevant text of the legislation, didn't fully indemnify consumers for noncommercial, private copying. Such copying is broadly permitted using analog devices and media, but digital copying is only permitted with certain technology like DAT, MiniDisc, and "audio" CD-R—not with computer hard drives, portable media players, and general-purpose CD-Rs.

The AHRA was partially tested in RIAA v. Diamond Multimedia, Inc., a late-1990s case which broached the subject of a consumer's right to copy and format-shift, but which ultimately only ascertained that one of the first portable MP3 players wasn't even a "digital recording device" covered by the law, so its maker wasn't required to pay royalties to the recording industry under other terms of the AHRA.

Statements made by the court in that case, and by both the House and Senate in committee reports about the AHRA, do interpret the legislation as being intended to permit private, noncommercial copying with any digital technology. However, these interpretations may not be binding.

In 2007, the Federal Trade Commission (FTC), a government office which requires business to engage in consumer-friendly trade practices, has acknowledged that consumers normally expect to be able to rip audio CDs. Specifically, in response to the Sony BMG copy protection rootkit scandal, the FTC declared that the marketing and sale of audio CDs which surreptitiously installed digital rights management (DRM) software constituted deceptive and unfair trade practices, in part because the record company "represented, expressly or by implication, that consumers will be able to use the CDs as they are commonly used on a computer: to listen to, transfer to playback devices, and copy the audio files contained on the CD for personal use."

A DVD ripper''' is a computer program that facilitates copying the content of a DVD to a hard disk drive. They are mainly used to transfer video on DVDs to different formats, to edit or back up DVD content, and to convert DVD video for playback on media players and mobile devices. Some DVD rippers include additional features such as Blu-ray support, DVD and Blu-ray Disc decryption, copy protection removal and the ability to make discs unrestricted and region-free.  While most DVD rippers only convert video to highly compressed MP4 video files, there are other rippers that can convert DVDs to higher quality compressed video.  These types of DVD rippers are used by the television and film industry to create broadcast quality video from DVD.  Video ripped by these professional DVD rippers is an exact duplicate of the original DVD video.

 Circumvention of DVD copy protection 

In the case where media contents are protected using some effective copy protection scheme, the Digital Millennium Copyright Act (DMCA) of 1998 makes it illegal to manufacture or distribute circumvention tools and use those tools for infringing purposes. In the 2009 case RealNetworks v. DVD CCA'', the final injunction reads, "while it may well be fair use for an individual consumer to store a backup copy of a personally owned DVD on that individual's computer, a federal law has nonetheless made it illegal to manufacture or traffic in a device or tool that permits a consumer to make such copies." This case made clear that manufacturing and distribution of circumvention tools was illegal, but use of those tools for non-infringing purposes, including fair use purposes, was not.

The Library of Congress periodically issues rulings to exempt certain classes of works from the DMCA's prohibition on the circumvention of copy protection for non-infringing purposes. One such ruling in 2010 declared, among other things, that the Content Scramble System (CSS) commonly employed on commercial DVDs could be circumvented to enable non-infringing uses of the DVD's content. The Electronic Frontier Foundation (EFF) hailed the ruling as enabling DVD excerpts to be used for the well-established fair-use activities of criticism and commentary, and for the creation of derivative works by video remix artists. However, the text of the ruling says the exemption can only be exercised by professional educators and their students, not the general public.

See also

References

 
Copyright law
Audio storage
Video storage
Video conversion software
DVD